Tanae Davis-Cain (born June 7, 1987) is an American professional basketball player. She played high school basketball for Terrell County in Dawson, Georgia, where she averaged 16.2 points during her senior season and was named the All-Area player of the year by the Albany Herald. Following her graduation, she played college basketball for Florida State from 2005 to 2009. She was the schools 22nd player to score at least 1,000 points during her career and left the school as its all time leader in three point shots made. Davis-Cain was drafted by the Detroit Shock in the third round of the 2009 WNBA draft and later appeared in one game for the team during the 2009 season.

Florida State statistics

Source

References

1987 births
Living people
American women's basketball players
Detroit Shock players
Florida State Seminoles women's basketball players
Guards (basketball)